Lucie Guay (born December 12, 1958 in Montreal, Quebec) is a Canadian sprint kayaker who competed in the early 1980s. She won a bronze medal in the K-4 500 m event at the 1984 Summer Olympics in Los Angeles.

References
Sports-reference.com profile

1958 births
Canadian female canoeists
Canoeists at the 1984 Summer Olympics
Olympic canoeists of Canada
Olympic bronze medalists for Canada
Canoeists from Montreal
Living people
Olympic medalists in canoeing
Medalists at the 1984 Summer Olympics